Oedipus Tex and Other Choral Calamities was released in 1990 by Telarc Records. The album contains works by Peter Schickele under his alter-ego of P. D. Q. Bach and won a 1990 Grammy Award for 'Best Comedy Performance'.

Performers 
 Professor Peter Schickele, conductor, bass
 The Greater Hoople Area Off-Season Philharmonic, Newton Wayland, conductor
 The Okay Chorale
 Grandmaster Flab and the Hoople Funkharmonic
 Pamela South, soprano (Billie Jo Casta)
 Dana Krueger, mezzo-soprano (Madame Peep)
 Frank Kelley (tenor)
 Brice Andrus, horn

Track listing
Introduction
Oedipus Tex, opera/dramatic oratorio, S. 150
Prologue: "Tragedy"
Recitative: "Well"
Aria with chorus: "Howdy there"
Recitative: "And it wasn't long"
Duet with chorus: "My heart"
Recitative: "But"
Aria: "You murdered your father"
Recitative: "When Billie Jo heard"
Aria with chorus: "Goodbye"
Recitative: "When Oedipus heard"
Chorus and Finale
Introduction
Classical Rap, S. 1-2-3
Introduction
Knock, Knock, choral cantata, S. 4/1
Recitative and chorus: "Knock, knock"
Recitative and chorus: "How many psychiatrists"
Recitative and chorale: "What is the question?"
Recitative and chorus: "So this guy"
Introduction
Birthday Ode to "Big Daddy" Bach, S. 100

References

P. D. Q. Bach albums
1990 albums
Grammy Award for Best Comedy Album
1990s comedy albums
Telarc Records albums